The Australian rugby league team North Queensland Cowboys and individual team members have won a variety of titles and honours since their foundation in 1995. The club has appeared in three grand finals of the National Rugby League premiership, winning in 2015, and has reached the finals ten times. Individual player awards include the Paul Bowman Medal and other honours awarded annually by the club itself and by external bodies, such as the Rugby League World Golden Boot Award which has gone to the Cowboys' Johnathan Thurston three times.

Team honours

Premierships

Runners-up

Minor premierships
None

Finals appearances
11 - 2004, 2005, 2007, 2011, 2012, 2013, 2014, 2015, 2016, 2017 and 2022.

Club awards
Each year the Paul Bowman Medal is awarded to the Cowboys' best and fairest player of the season. The medal was named after Bowman, following his retirement in 2007.

Paul Bowman Medal

Players' Player

Club Person of the Year

Rookie of the Year

Most Improved

Coach's Award
The Most Improved Award was replaced by the Coach's Award in 2017.

Cowboys Way Award
The Coach's Award was replaced by the Cowboys Way award in 2021.

Member's Player of the Year

Gold Stars Player of the Year

Gold Stars Cowboys Way Award

North Queensland Cowboys Young Guns Cowboys Way Award

Individual honours

Golden Boot
The Golden Boot is awarded annually to the world's best player.
2011 Johnathan Thurston
2013 Johnathan Thurston
2015 Johnathan Thurston

Dally M Medal
The Dally M Medal is awarded to the best player over the NRL season.
2005 Johnathan Thurston
2007 Johnathan Thurston
2014 Johnathan Thurston
2015 Johnathan Thurston
2016 Jason Taumalolo

Wally Lewis Medal
The Wally Lewis medal is awarded each year to the State of Origin's man of the series.
2008 Johnathan Thurston

Dally M Team of the Year
Each year at the Dally M awards, the best players in their position during the NRL season are selected for the team of the year.
2004 Paul Rauhihi (Prop)
2005 Johnathan Thurston (Halfback)
2007 Matthew Bowen (Fullback)
2007 Johnathan Thurston (Halfback)
2009 Johnathan Thurston (Halfback)
2011 Matthew Scott (Prop)
2012 Johnathan Thurston (Five-Eighth)
2013 Johnathan Thurston (Five-Eighth)
2014 Johnathan Thurston (Five-Eighth)
2015 Johnathan Thurston (Halfback)
2015 Jason Taumalolo (Lock)
2016 Jason Taumalolo (Lock)
2017 Michael Morgan (Halfback)
2018 Jason Taumalolo (Lock)
2022 Valentine Holmes (Centre)
2022 Jeremiah Nanai (Second Row)

Dally M Coach of the Year
2022 Todd Payten

Dally M Rookie of the Year
2022 Jeremiah Nanai

RLPA Player of the Year
2005 Johnathan Thurston
2013 Johnathan Thurston
2014 Johnathan Thurston
2015 Johnathan Thurston
2016 Jason Taumalolo

RLIF Team of the Year
Awarded to the best players in the world at their position during the season by the Rugby League International Federation.
2009 Johnathan Thurston (Halfback)
2011 Matthew Scott (Prop)
2012 Johnathan Thurston (Five-Eighth)

RLW Player of the Year
Awarded each year since 1970 by the magazine Rugby League Week.
2007 Johnathan Thurston and Matthew Bowen
2016 Jason Taumalolo

NRL Nines Most Valuable Player
2020 Scott Drinkwater

National Youth Competition honours

Team honours
Premierships
None

Runners-up
1 - 2011 (lost 30–31 to the New Zealand Warriors)

Minor premierships
None

Wooden spoons
1 - 2008

Finals appearances
5 - 2010, 2011, 2015, 2016, 2017

Club awards

Individual honours
NYC Team of the Year
2010 James Segeyaro (Hooker)
2011 Jason Taumalolo (Second Row)
2011 Kyle Feldt (Interchange)
2012 Chris Grevsmuhl (Interchange)
2015 Gideon Gela-Mosby (Wing)
2015 Viliame Kikau (Prop)
2015 Coen Hess (Second Row)
2016 Kalyn Ponga (Fullback)
2016 Gideon Gela-Mosby (Wing)
2016 Brandon Smith (Hooker)
2017 Kalyn Ponga (Fullback)
2017 Jake Clifford (Interchange)

Dally M Player of the Year
2017 Jake Clifford

RLPA Player of the Year
2011 Jason Taumalolo

See also

References

External links

North Queensland Cowboys
Rugby league trophies and awards
National Rugby League lists